9th Politburo may refer to:
9th Politburo of the Chinese Communist Party
Politburo of the 9th Congress of the Russian Communist Party (Bolsheviks)
9th Politburo of the Party of Labour of Albania
9th Politburo of the Communist Party of Czechoslovakia
9th Politburo of the Socialist Unity Party of Germany
9th Politburo of the Polish United Workers' Party
9th Politburo of the Romanian Communist Party
9th Politburo of the Lao People's Revolutionary Party
9th Politburo of the Communist Party of Vietnam
9th Politburo of the League of Communists of Yugoslavia
9th Politburo of the Hungarian Socialist Workers' Party